Houari is a given name and surname. It may refer to:

Persons

Given name
Houari Boumédiène, also transcribed Boumediene, Boumedienne etc. (1932–1978), served as Chairman of the Revolutionary Council of Algeria from 19 June 1965 until 12 December 1976 and thereafter as the second President of Algeria until his death on 27 December 1978
Houari Benchenet (born 1961), Algerian raï singer
Houari Djemili (born 1987), Algerian footballer 
Houari Ferhani (born 1993), Algerian footballer
Houari Manar (1981–2019), Algerian raï singer

Surname
Sidi El Houari (1350–1439), Algerian imam 
Blaoui Houari (1926-2017), Algerian singer-songwriter, composer and conductor
Kamel Jdayni Houari (born 1980), better known as Kamelancien later shortened into Kamelanc', French rapper of Moroccan origin
Mohammed Houari (born 1977), Moroccan player
Muriel Hurtis-Houairi or Hurtis-Houari (born 1979), French track and field athlete

See also
Méchraâ Houari Boumédienne, a town and commune in Abadla District, Béchar Province, in western Algeria
Houari Boumediene Airport, Algerian airport
University of Science and Technology Houari Boumediene, Algerian university